The Sinan Pasha Mosque is an Ottoman mosque located in a densely populated district of Beşiktaş, in Istanbul, Turkey. It was built by the Ottoman architect Mimar Sinan for the admiral Sinan Pasha. The türbe (tomb) of Barbaros Hayrettin Pasha is located just across the street.

History
The mosque was endowed by the Ottoman admiral Sinan Pasha who was the younger brother of the grand vizier Rüstem Pasha. The mosque was designed by the imperial architect Mimar Sinan. Sinan Pasha died in 1554 and work began after his death. The gilded Arabic foundation inscription above the arched gateway of the mosque records the completion date as November/December 1555. The Turkish inscription carved around the white marble fountain basin in the courtyard records the date as 1555–56.

Architecture
The forecourt of the mosque is surrounded on three sides by the madrasa. This has a shed roof supported on short columns and lacks a classroom. At the centre of the courtyard is a rectangular drinking fountain. The mosque is constructed of alternating layers of ashlar and brick. The north side of the mosque originally had a double portico but in 1749 the inner portico with five domes was incorporated into the prayer hall. The  dome is supported on six arches with two free-standing hexagonal piers. The original painted decoration has not survived. The simple minbar is made of white marble. The bath-house, which formed part of the original endowment, was demolished in 1957.

The design of the Sinan Pasha Mosque has been compared with the earlier Üç Şerefeli Mosque in Edirne which dates from 1437 to 1448. In both mosques a dome is supported on six arches with two free-standing piers.

Gallery

See also
 List of Friday mosques designed by Mimar Sinan
 List of mosques in Istanbul

References

Sources

External links

Sinan Pasha Cami, Archnet
Photographs of the Sinan Pasha Mosque by Dick Osseman
 Respect to Sinan foundation

Mimar Sinan buildings
Ottoman mosques in Istanbul
Beşiktaş
1555 establishments in the Ottoman Empire
Mosques completed in 1555